Jørgen Sørlie (born 29 November 1956) is a Norwegian former footballer who played as a midfielder for Rosenborg between 1979 and 1986. He played 125 league matches and became league champion in 1985. Sørlie was top scorer for Rosenborg in the 1979 season.

References

1956 births
Living people
Norwegian footballers
Association football midfielders
Eliteserien players
Rosenborg BK players